Torpedo boats had been operated by the Imperial German Navy (German: Kaiserliche Marine) from the very beginning. The "Imperial Navy" existed between 1871 and 1919. In 1870 there had been 14 tugboats and harbour vessels and 7 rowing boats, which had been armed with spar torpedoes to protect the Elbe and Weser during the Franco-Prussian War.

Early torpedo vessels and boats

Small torpedo boats – pre-war types 

6 boats built at AG Weser, Bremen; 10 boats built at AG Vulcan, Stettin; 6 boats built at Schichau, Elbing.

The later USS Somers was built as a private speculation by Schichau in 1897.

Small and coastal torpedo boats in World War I

Small torpedo boats 

60 boats of S 7-class had been built at Schichau, Elbing, 22 boats of S 66-class had been built at Schichau and the boats G 88 and G 89 had been built at Germaniawerft in Kiel. 

The first boats had been stricken in 1905. The remaining boats had been renamed in 1910 and 1914 as SM T 11 – SM T 65. S12, T 21, T 25, S 26, S 32, S 41, S 48, T 50 got lost by collisions or storm. The S 66-class boats had been renamed in 1914 as SM T 66 – SM T 89. 

In World War I the remaining boats had been used as mine sweepers, school boats and tenders. T 43, T 46, T 47, T 51, T 52, T 54, T 57, T 58, T 64, T 65 and T 66, T 67, T 68, T 78 had been sunk by mines.

Coastal torpedo boats 

The A-class torpedo boats were a class of single-funnelled torpedo boat or light destroyer designed for operations off the coast of occupied Flanders in the First World War. Six groups of vessels were built under the class between 1914 and 1918, increasing in displacement from 109 tons to 335 tons.

Divisional torpedo boats 

This boats had been the predecessors of the ocean-going torpedo boats. In the first years they had been used as torpedo boat leaders. D 1 – D 9 had been built by Schichau, Elbing. D 10 was built by Thornycroft.

German ocean-going torpedo boats 

The ocean-going torpedo boats (Hochseetorpedoboote) or large torpedo boats (Große Torpedoboote) had been in many ways the equivalent of the contemporary destroyers in other navies. But the gun armament had been lighter  than British destroyers. In 1916 most of the boats of the 1913/1913 Mob-type had been refitted with three much more powerful  SK L/45 guns, with 70 shells per gun. 

 1898 Type Large Torpedoboat (S90-class): 48 boats, built over 8 years 

 1906 Type Large Torpedoboat (S138-class): 60 boats (4 additional boats sold to the Turkish Navy) built over 5 years

 1911 Type Large Torpedoboat (V1-class): 24 boats (2 additional boats sold to the Greek Navy) built to a smaller design

 1913 / 1913 Mob Type Large Torpedoboat (V25-class): 71 boats, reverted to larger design; numbers increased due to First World War

 1916 Mob Type Large Torpedoboat (V125-class): 36 boats, built for war service

 1917 Mob Type Large Torpedoboat (G148-class): 22 boats, 13 scrapped before completion, 9 scrapped on slip

Destroyer types 

 Russian Destroyer Type (B 97-class): 8 destroyers

 Argentinian Destroyer Type (G101-class): 4 destroyers

 Dutch Destroyers (V105-class): 4 boats (SM V 105, SM V 106, SM V 107, SM V 108)

 Large German Destroyer, 1916 Type (S113-class): 12 destroyers: 10 scrapped before completion, 2 completed; SMS S 113 (2,377 tons, 4-150mm guns and 4–60 cm torpedo tubes), SMS V 116 (2,320 tons, 4-150mm guns and 4–60 cm torpedo tubes).

 Large Torpedo Boat, 1918 Mob Type: V170-class (23 boats, 1,268 tons, 4-105mm guns and 6–50 cm torpedo tubes), S178-class (21 boats 1,268 tons, 4-150mm guns and 6–50 cm torpedo tubes). None had been launched by the time of the armistice, after which all contracts were cancelled.

Citations

References